Mont Saint-Bernard was an 82-gun  of the French Navy.

On 20 April 1814, after the abdication of Napoleon at the end of the War of the Sixth Coalition, she was handed over to the Austrians, who burnt her.

See also
 List of ships of the line of France

References

External links

Ships of the line of the French Navy
Téméraire-class ships of the line
1811 ships